Geitungen Lighthouse is a coastal lighthouse in the municipality of Karmøy in Rogaland county, Norway. The island is accessible only by boat. The lighthouse was established in 1924 and it was automated in 1994. It was listed as a protected site in 1998.

Technical specifications
The concrete masonry tower is attached to a U-shaped one-story lighthouse keeper's house. The lighthouse is painted white and the roof is red. The lighthouse also emits a racon signal, using the morse code letter "G". The racon signal can be received inside a  radius of the lighthouse.

History
The lighthouse was established in 1924 as a replacement for Skudenes Lighthouse, which had operated from 1799 to 1924.

Geitungen Lighthouse was designed by Jørgen H. Meinich, who later also designed Makkaur Lighthouse. The argument for a new location, was the need for a foghorn. The diaphone at Geitungen Lighthouse was the first diaphone installed in Norway. Geitungen was automated and depopulated in 1994, and was listed as a protected site in 1998. The protected site includes the lighthouse and three technical buildings.

Tourist station
The living house associated with Geitungen Lighthouse is operated as a tourist station by the Norwegian Trekking Association, through its Haugesund chapter. It has 35 beds available for visitors. The site is only accessible by boat.

See also

Lighthouses in Norway
List of lighthouses in Norway

References

External links
 Norsk Fyrhistorisk Forening 

Lighthouses completed in 1924
Lighthouses in Rogaland
Listed lighthouses in Norway
Karmøy